The 55th New York Film Festival took place from September 28 to October 15, 2017. The festival's opening film was Richard Linklater's Last Flag Flying, and its closing film was Woody Allen's Wonder Wheel.

Main slate

Spotlight on Documentaries

Special events

Projections 
In addition to the following feature films, the Projections lineup also included several programs of short films, including programs devoted to the work of Barbara Hammer and Mike Henderson.

Revivals

Robert Mitchum Retrospective

Shorts

References

External links

New York Film Festival
New York
New York Film Festival
2017 festivals in the United States